Lieutenant-General Sir Alexander James Wilson KBE MC (13 April 1921 – 17 December 2004) was a British Army officer who commanded South East District.

Military career
Born the son of Major-General Bevil Wilson and educated at Winchester College and New College, Oxford, Wilson originally enlisted with the King's Shropshire Light Infantry and was then commissioned into the Rifle Brigade in 1941. He served in World War II in North Africa and in Italy earning the MC for taking the village of Lusia. After the War he served as private secretary to the Commander-in-Chief of the newly independent Pakistan Army. He served in Kenya during the Mau Mau Uprising in 1954 and became Commanding Officer of 1st Battalion the Lancashire Fusiliers in 1962. He was appointed Chief of Staff for the United Nations force in Cyprus in 1964, Commander of 147th Infantry Brigade in 1966 and Director of Army Recruiting at the Ministry of Defence in 1967. He went on to be General Officer Commanding North West District in 1970, Vice Adjutant-General in 1972 and General Officer Commanding South East District in 1974 before retiring in 1977.

In retirement he was given the colonelcy of the Royal Regiment of Fusiliers from 1977 to 1982. He was also chairman and then chief executive of the Tobacco Advisory Council and a Football Correspondent for The Sunday Times.

Family
In 1958 he married the Hon. Jean Margaret Rankeillour, daughter of Arthur Hope, 2nd Baron Rankeillour; they had two sons, one step-son and two step-daughters.

Works 
'Unusual Undertakings: A Military Memoir' by James Wilson

References

 

|-
 

|-

1921 births
2004 deaths
People educated at Winchester College
Alumni of New College, Oxford
British Army lieutenant generals
Knights Commander of the Order of the British Empire
Recipients of the Military Cross
Rifle Brigade officers
British military personnel of the Mau Mau Uprising
Lancashire Fusiliers officers
British Army personnel of World War II
King's Shropshire Light Infantry soldiers